Arvid Gjengedal (born 19 July 1943, dead 30 December 2021) was a Norwegian educationalist and politician for the Conservative Party.

He was born in Lom, finished his secondary education in Lillehammer in 1963 and graduated with a cand.philol. degree in history from the University of Oslo. He was hired at the Notodden Teachers' College in 1971, and when it merged to form the Telemark University College in 1994, Gjengedal became dean of the department of teachers' education. From 1997 to 2003 he served as the rector of the college.

Gjengedal served as a deputy representative to the Norwegian Parliament from Telemark during the term 1985–1989. He has also been an elected member of Notodden city council and Telemark county council, both for twelve years. He chaired the county branch of the Conservative Party from 1991 to 1995. In 2005 he unsuccessfully applied for the position as County Governor of Telemark.

References

1946 births
Living people
People from Lom, Norway
University of Oslo alumni
Norwegian educators
Academic staff of Telemark University College
Rectors of universities and colleges in Norway
Conservative Party (Norway) politicians
People from Notodden
Politicians from Telemark
Deputy members of the Storting